{{DISPLAYTITLE:C23H22N2O}}
The molecular formula C23H22N2O (molar mass: 342.434 g/mol, exact mass: 342.1732 u) may refer to:

 BIM-018
 THJ-018 (SGT-17)

Molecular formulas